Calcium acetate/magnesium carbonate is a fixed-dose combination drug that contains 110 mg calcium and 60 mg magnesium ions and is indicated as a phosphate binder for dialysis patients with hyperphosphataemia (abnormal high serum phosphorus levels). It is registered by Fresenius Medical Care under the trade names Renepho (Belgium) and OsvaRen (a number of other European countries).

Clinical use

Phosphorus is contained in food with high protein content as well as in processed food. It is absorbed by the small intestine. Healthy kidneys remove excess phosphorus from the body. One of the consequences of renal failure is inadequate removal of phosphorus resulting in increased serum phosphorus levels. This may worsen the overproduction of parathyroid hormone (hyperparathyroidism), and may lead to renal osteodystrophy, calcification of blood vessels and is associated with cardiovascular mortality (the so-called chronic kidney disease-mineral and bone disorder, CKD-MBD). In addition to dialysis therapy and dietary restrictions, a pharmaceutical therapy to lower serum phosphorus levels is recommended.

Mechanism of action

Calcium acetate/magnesium carbonate is taken orally together with the meal. Calcium acetate and magnesium carbonate compounds bind phosphorus derived from food thereby forming indigestible phosphate salts in the intestine that are subsequently excreted with the faeces. The aim of the therapy is to reach a normal serum phosphorus level, i.e. between 0.81 and 1.45 mmol/L (2.5–4.5 mg/dL).

Side effects

Side effects from pharmaceutical therapy such as gastrointestinal disorders, e.g. nausea, constipation or diarrhoea may occur, as well as metabolism and nutritional disorders, e.g. hypercalcaemia or hypermagnesaemia.

See also
 Chronic kidney disease
 Chronic kidney disease-mineral and bone disorder
 Renal osteodystrophy

References

External links
 Phosphorus and Your CKD Diet - kidney.org
 Information on Hyperphosphataemia by Fresenius Medical Care - fmc-renalpharma.com

Phosphate binders
Combination drugs